Connecticut's 129th House of Representatives district elects one member of the Connecticut House of Representatives. It encompasse parts of Bridgeport and has been represented by Democrat Steven Stafstrom since 2015.

Recent elections

2020

2018

2016

2015 special

2014

2012

References

129